Yessir, That's My Baby is a 1978 album by Oscar Peterson and Count Basie.

Track listing
 "Blues for Roy" (Count Basie, Oscar Peterson) - 6:00
 "Teach Me Tonight" (Sammy Cahn, Gene de Paul) - 3:57
 "Joe Turner" (Basie, Peterson) - 8:58
 "Blues for C.T." (Basie, Peterson) - 2:53
 "Yes Sir, That's My Baby" (Walter Donaldson, Gus Kahn) - 5:35
 "Tea for Two" (Irving Caesar, Vincent Youmans) - 5:49
 "After You've Gone" (Henry Creamer, Turner Layton) - 5:09
 "Poor Butterfly" (John Golden, Raymond Hubbell) - 5:16

Personnel
Recorded February 21, 1978, Group IV Recording Studios, Hollywood, Los Angeles, California:

 Count Basie - piano, organ
 Oscar Peterson - piano
 John Heard - double bass
 Louie Bellson - drums
 Benny Green  - liner notes
 Norman Granz - producer

References

1978 albums
Count Basie albums
Oscar Peterson albums
Albums produced by Norman Granz
Pablo Records albums